The referee in boxing is the individual charged with enforcing the rules of that sport during a match.

The role of the referee
The referee has the following roles:
Gives instructions to both boxers before the fight
Determines when to start or stop a count when a fighter is down
Determines when a foul is so egregious that a warning should be given or points taken away
Signals when the round is over
Determines when one fighter's health will be endangered by more blows, and thus, stops the fight.

In the past, referees were involved in judging the fight. However, that role has been progressively replaced by a panel of judges, except for domestic fights in some countries.

Attire
Normally, a white or blue Oxford shirt is worn, as well as black slacks, black leather shoes and a black bow tie. Latex gloves are sometimes worn for sanitary reasons.  For professional matches a patch is usually worn on the left breast bearing the insignia of the organization sanctioning the fight. The referee may also wear a patch on his left sleeve bearing the flag of his home country. This is especially common in matches between fighters from two countries.

Criticisms
The main critique involves the subjective nature of boxing refereeing; there are guidelines for referees, but enforcement of the rules still involves judgement.

Notable referees
 Stanley Christodoulou
 Joe Cortez
 Kenny Bayless
 Daniel Van de Wiele
 Ruby Goldstein
 Mills Lane
 Arthur Mercante
 Jay Nady
 Randy Neumann
 Richard Steele
 Mickey Vann
 Pete Podgorski
 Joey Curtis
 Octavio Meyran
 Eddie Cotton
 Charles Eyton
 Frank Cappuccino
 Steve Smoger
 Jon D. Schorle II
 Tony Perez

References

External links
 How to Become an Official - Boxing
 * Book - Third Man in the Ring